Kılıçkaya (formerly: Ersis) is a village in the Yusufeli District, Artvin Province, Turkey. Its population is 806 (2021). Before the 2013 reorganisation, it was a town (belde). 

In 1547, the town was incorporated into Ottoman Empire. After Russian occupation following the Russo-Turkish War (1877-1878) Kılıçkaya was returned to Turkey. In 1930 Sadiye Hanım became the mayor of the town as one of the first female town mayors of Turkey.

References

Villages in Yusufeli District